Karukas may refer to:

 Plural of karuka, a tree cultivated for its edible nuts
 Gregg Karukas (born 1956), US musician